Édouard Riou (2 December 1833 – 27 January 1900) was a French illustrator who illustrated six novels by Jules Verne, as well as several other well-known works.

Life

Riou was born in 1833 in Saint-Servan, Ille-et-Vilaine, and studied under Charles-François Daubigny and Gustave Doré, graduating in 1859. Apart from supplying designs for wood-engravings, his artistic specialties included landscape painting and commemorative art (including works for the opening of the Suez Canal and the marriage of a daughter of the Czar).

His collaboration with Jules Verne started in 1865 with the publication of Verne's novel Five Weeks in a Balloon, and continued for a run of six novels in all:

Five Weeks in a Balloon (1865): 51 illustrations by Riou (40) and Henri de Montaut (5), unsigned (6), wood-engravings by Coste, Delaville, Dumont, Fournier, Hildibrand, Pannemaker, Prunaire
The Adventures of Captain Hatteras (1866): 259 illustrations by Riou (190) and Henri de Montaut (69), wood-engravings by Barbant, Cazat, Delaville, Dumont, Hildibrand, Joliet, Linton, Pannemaker, Pierdon, Pisan, Prunaire
Journey to the Center of the Earth (1867): 56 illustrations, wood-engravings by Pannemaker, Gauchard, Charles Maurand
The Children of Captain Grant (1868): 175 illustrations, wood-engravings by Delaville, Gauchard, Maurand, Pannemaker, Prunaire
Twenty Thousand Leagues Under the Sea (1871): 111 illustrations by Riou (24, the first eleven chapters) and Alphonse de Neuville (86), wood-engravings by Hildibrand
The Survivors of the Chancellor (1875): 45 illustrations by Riou (45) and Jules Férat (13), wood-engravings by Charles Barbant, Crosbie, Dumont, Hildibrand, Louis, Méaulle, Pannemaker

Regarding Riou's work for Twenty Thousand Leagues Under the Sea, Verne wrote in 1868: "I have received the drawings from Riou. I have several suggestions to make which I'll mention to him by return mail. I think he needs to make the people much smaller and the rooms much larger. And he needs to add much more detail...  By the way, it was an excellent idea to use Colonel Charras as the model for Captain Nemo. I should've thought of that."

The illustrator and Verne scholar Ron Miller has said: "I believe his work stylistically spans the transition between the illustrators of the early 19th century and those of the latter half—when the profession of professional illustrators became established. Some of the qualities that Riou carried over were the often cartoon-like depiction of characters and the use of numerous 'spot' illustrations."

Edmondo Marcucci wrote: "Riou's drawings are rich with light, and the traits of his characters have a vigorous expression. Riou succeeds in adapting himself artistically to the realistic reproduction of the many fantastic locales of the Vernian fictional geography: the mists and the glacial icepacks, the shadows inside the Earth's crust, the deserted and expansive beaches, and the many bodies of water and their movement... Everything is both ordered and evocative in Riou's work—his style might be called 'romantic realism.'"

Riou also illustrated Walter Scott's Ivanhoe (1880) and Waverley, Victor Hugo's Notre Dame de Paris, Louis Figuier's La terre avant le deluge (1863), Alexandre Dumas' The Count of Monte Cristo (1887). He became a member of the Legion of Honour.

Riou died in Paris on January 27, 1900.

See also 
 Jules Férat (1819–1889)
 Léon Benett (1839–1917)
 Georges Roux (1850–1929)
 Émile-Antoine Bayard (1837–1891)
 Alphonse de Neuville (1835–1885)
 Paul-Dominique Philippoteaux (1846-1923)

Footnotes

References
 Arthur B. Evans: The Illustrators of Jules Verne's Voyages Extraordinaires. In Science-Fiction Studies, XXV:2 (July 1998): 241-70.
 Charles-Noël Martin: La Vie et l'oeuvre de Jules Verne (Paris: Michel de l'Ormeraie, 1978).
 André Bottin: Bibliographie des éditions illustrées des Voyages Extraordinaires de Jules Verne (Contes: Chez l'auteur, 1978).
 Edmondo Marcucci: Les Illustrations des Voyages Extraordinaires de Jules Verne (Bordeaux: Ed. Société Jules Verne, 1956).

External links 

 
 
 
 
 
 Zvi Har'El's Jules Verne Collection

1833 births
1900 deaths
People from Ille-et-Vilaine
19th-century French painters
French male painters
French illustrators
Jules Verne